Willard Leon Beaulac (July 25, 1899 – August 25, 1990) was an American diplomat. He served as U.S. Ambassador to Paraguay, Colombia, Cuba, Chile and Argentina.

Biography
Willard L. Beaulac was born on July 25, 1899 in Pawtucket, Rhode Island to Sylvester Clinton Beaulac and Lena Eleanor Jarvis. He attended Brown University before joining the United States Navy in 1918. After his honorable discharge in 1919, he attended the School of Foreign Service at Georgetown University and graduated in 1921.

Beaulac joined the United States Foreign Service in 1921. He received his first ambassadorial appointment to Paraguay in 1944. in 1947 he was named United States Ambassador to Colombia. He married Catherine Hazel Arrott Greene on February 25, 1935.

From 1951 to 1953 he was United States Ambassador to Cuba. In 1953 he succeeded Claude G. Bowers as United States Ambassador to Chile. From 1956 to 1960 he was United States Ambassador to Argentina. Before retiring around 1962 he was the deputy commandant for foreign affairs of the National War College.

Beaulac died from Alzheimer's disease in Washington, DC, on August 25, 1990, at the age of 91.

Positions
  US Ambassador to Argentina (1956–60)
  US Ambassador to Chile (1953–56)
  US Ambassador to Cuba (1951–53)
   US Ambassador to Colombia (1947–51)
   US Ambassador to Paraguay (1944–47)
  US State Department Consul General, Madrid (1941–44)
   US State Department Counsellor, Havana (1940–41)
  US State Department Assistant Chief, Division of American Republics (1937–40)
   US State Department Assistant Chief, Division of Latin American Affairs (1934–37)
  US State Department Second Secretary, San Salvador, El Salvador (1933)
   US State Department Second Secretary, Managua, Nicaragua (1928–33)
   US State Department Third Secretary, Port-au-Prince, Haiti (1927–28)
   US State Department Consul, Arica, Chile (1925–27)
   US State Department Vice Consul, Puerto Castilla, Honduras (1923–25)
   US State Department Vice Consul, Tampico, Mexico (1921–23)

Professor
 Southern Illinois University
 Ball State University

Works
 Career Ambassador, Macmillan, 1951, (memoir)
 Career Diplomat: A Career in the Foreign Service of the United States (1966)
 A Diplomat Looks at Aid to Latin America, Southern Illinois University Press, 1970
  
 Franco: Silent Ally in World War II, Southern Illinois University Press, 1986,

References

External links

 United States Department of State: Chiefs of Mission by Country, 1778-2005
 Willard L. Beaulac at The Political Graveyard

1899 births
1990 deaths
Ambassadors of the United States to Argentina
Ambassadors of the United States to Chile
Ambassadors of the United States to Colombia
Ambassadors of the United States to Cuba
Ambassadors of the United States to Paraguay
People from Pawtucket, Rhode Island
Brown University alumni
Walsh School of Foreign Service alumni
Deaths from Alzheimer's disease
Neurological disease deaths in Washington, D.C.
United States Foreign Service personnel
20th-century American diplomats